The Last Pinoy Action King is a 2015 Philippine documentary film directed by Andrew Leavold and Daniel Palisa. The film focuses on the life of Rudy Fernandez, as well as the Philippine action film industry. It was first released on October 22, 2015, as part of the annual QCinema International Film Festival.

Interviewees

References

External links

2015 films
2015 documentary films
Filipino-language films
Philippine documentary films